A destructive outbreak of nine tornadoes struck the Great Plains on May 29, 1953. The worst one was an F5 tornado that hit Fort Rice, North Dakota, destroying multiple structures and causing the majority of the casualties that day. Other strong tornadoes occurred that day, including an F2 tornado that did major damage when it struck McLaughlin, South Dakota. Overall, the outbreak killed two people, injured 22 others, and caused $827,500 (1953 USD) in damage.

Meteorological synopsis
An unusually strong surface low-pressure system moved into northwestern South Dakota during the afternoon of May 29, 1953. A dryline extended from this strong low southward ahead of a cold front that curled southwestward while a warm front extended east-northeastward into the Coteau des Prairies of southeastern North Dakota Behind the surface low, an upper-level low moved northeastward through Montana, increasing the pressure gradient over the Northern Plains and inducing high wind shear across the area. Temperatures that afternoon reached anywhere from the upper-80s to mid-90s and with dew points from 60-70°F, the atmosphere was ripe for an outbreak of severe thunderstorms.

Confirmed tornadoes

See also
List of North American tornadoes and tornado outbreaks
List of F5 and EF5 tornadoes
June 20–23, 1957 tornado outbreak sequence
Fargo tornado

Notes

References

Tornadoes of 1953
Tornadoes in Nebraska
Tornadoes in Kansas
Tornadoes in Wyoming
Tornadoes in North Dakota
Tornadoes in South Dakota